Ben Vaeau (born 7 January 1982) is a professional rugby league footballer who currently plays for Eastern Suburbs Tigers in the Queensland Cup. His position of preference is at prop.

Playing career
Vaeau played for the Manukau Magpies in the 2002 Auckland Rugby League competition.

Vaeau played for the Brisbane Broncos in 2006 and North Queensland Cowboys from 2007 to 2008 in the National Rugby League.

Representative career
Vaeau has represented the Cook Islands and was part of their squad at the 2009 Pacific Cup.

Statistics

Club career

References

External links
North Queensland Cowboys profile
 https://web.archive.org/web/20070905183724/http://www.cowboys.com.au/gallery.php?gallery=21&image=165

1982 births
Living people
Brisbane Broncos players
Cook Islands national rugby league team players
Eastern Suburbs Tigers players
New Zealand rugby league players
New Zealand sportspeople of Cook Island descent
North Queensland Cowboys players
Manukau Magpies players
Rugby league players from Auckland
Rugby league props
Rugby league second-rows
New Zealand expatriate rugby league players
Expatriate rugby league players in Australia
New Zealand expatriate sportspeople in Australia